Frankie Hammond Jr. (born February 17, 1990) is a former American football wide receiver. He played college football for the University of Florida and was signed by the Kansas City Chiefs as an undrafted free agent in 2013.

College career
Hammond accepted an athletic scholarship to attend the University of Florida, where he played for coach Urban Meyer and coach Will Muschamp's Florida Gators football teams from 2008 to 2012.  During his four-season college career, he started 19 of 48 games in which he played, recording 63 receptions for 809 yards and six touchdowns.  He was also a high jumper for the Florida Gators track and field team.

Professional career

Kansas City Chiefs
Hammond signed with the Kansas City Chiefs as an undrafted free agent after the 2013 NFL Draft. He spent the entire season on the Chiefs practice squad.  After spending the entire 2013 season on the Chiefs' practice squad, he debuted in Week 1 of the 2014 season, recording his first NFL career reception for 22 yards. Through the whole season, Hammond had 4 catches for 45 yards. On April 20, 2015, he was re-signed. On November 9, 2015, he was waived. On November 9, 2015, he was signed to the practice squad. On November 28, 2015, he was elevated to the active roster.

On September 3, 2016, Hammond was released by the Chiefs. The next day, he was signed to the Chiefs' practice squad.

New York Jets
On January 23, 2017, Hammond signed a reserve/future contract with the New York Jets. On September 2, 2017, he was waived by the Jets.

Orlando Apollos
In 2018, Hammond signed with the Orlando Apollos for the 2019 season.

See also
 List of Florida Gators in the NFL Draft

References

External links
 Kansas City Chiefs bio
 Florida Gators bio

1990 births
Living people
American football wide receivers
Florida Gators football players
Hammond, Frankie
Kansas City Chiefs players
New York Jets players
People from Hallandale Beach, Florida
Players of American football from Florida
Orlando Apollos players
Florida Gators men's track and field athletes
Sportspeople from Broward County, Florida